Thomas Glass may refer to:

People 

 Thomas Glass (–1911), Australian politician
 Thomas Glass (physician) (1709–1786), English physician
 Thomas R. Glass (1928–1998), American politician
 Tagwadihi, Cherokee chief